Explicit formula can refer to:

Closed-form expression, a mathematical expression in terms of a finite number of well-known functions
Analytical expression, a mathematical expression in terms of a finite or infinite number of well-known functions
Algebraic expression, a mathematical expression in terms of a finite number of algebraic operations (addition, subtraction, multiplication, division and exponentiation by a rational exponent )
Explicit formulae (L-function), relations between sums over the complex number zeroes  of an L-function and sums over prime powers